Sonbahar means autumn in Turkish.

It may also refer to:

Autumn (2008 film), Turkish title Sonbahar, a 2008 film by Özcan Alper
Sonbahar (Autumn), a 1959 film by Turkish director Türker İnanoğlu
"Sonbahar", a song by Levent Yüksel from his album Aşkla
"Sonbahar", a song by Mor ve Ötesi from their album Başıbozuk